Trevor Wilson (born March 16, 1968) is an American former professional basketball player. A 6'7" (201 cm), 210 lb (95 kg) forward, he played college basketball for the UCLA Bruins. Wilson played professionally in the National Basketball Association (NBA) from 1990 to 1995 with the Atlanta Hawks, Los Angeles Lakers, Sacramento Kings and Philadelphia 76ers.

In 1990, his finished his college career with UCLA ranked third on the school's career scoring list, fourth in rebounding, and sixth in assists and steals.

After his retirement from basketball, Wilson became a police officer with the Los Angeles Police Department.

References

External links

1968 births
Living people
American expatriate basketball people in France
American expatriate basketball people in Italy
American expatriate basketball people in Japan
American expatriate basketball people in Spain
American expatriate basketball people in Turkey
American men's basketball players
Atlanta Hawks draft picks
Atlanta Hawks players
Basketball players from Los Angeles
Cantabria Baloncesto players
CB Peñas Huesca players
Chicago Rockers players
Liga ACB players
Los Angeles Lakers players
Parade High School All-Americans (boys' basketball)
Philadelphia 76ers players
Sacramento Kings players
Scaligera Basket Verona players
SeaHorses Mikawa players
Sioux Falls Skyforce (CBA) players
Small forwards
Türk Telekom B.K. players
UCLA Bruins men's basketball players